The 2019–20 NIFL Championship was the fourth season of the NIFL Championship since gaining senior status. It is the second-tier of the Northern Ireland Football League - the national football league in Northern Ireland. The season began on 3 August 2019 and was originally scheduled to conclude in April 2020, However, the season was suspended on 13 March 2020 as a result of the worldwide COVID-19 pandemic. No further fixtures were played, with the final games held on 10 March 2020 and the season being officially curtailed in June 2020.

Larne were the current champions. However, due to their promotion to the 2019–20 NIFL Premiership, they were unable to defend their title. 

The Irish FA initially suspended all football-related activity in Northern Ireland until 4 April, with this suspension subsequently being extended first until 30 April, and then until 31 May. In June 2020, NIFL announced that the season was over, and that average points per game would be used to determine the final league standings. Portadown were declared champions, gaining promotion to the 2020–21 NIFL Premiership, while PSNI suffered relegation to the NIFL Premier Intermediate League. The promotion/relegation play-offs were cancelled, meaning 11th-placed Knockbreda were reprieved from relegation, and runners-up Ballinamallard United missed out on the chance of promotion.

Teams

The 2019–20 NIFL Championship is being contested by 12 teams, nine of which retained their Championship status from the previous season. Larne were champions in the previous season, and were promoted to the 2019–20 NIFL Premiership. They were replaced by the bottom team in last season's Premiership, Newry City. Runners-up Carrick Rangers won 3–1 on aggregate in the promotion play-off against Ards, also achieving promotion to the Premiership for this season and relegating Ards to the Championship.

The bottom team from the previous season, Limavady United, were relegated to the third-tier NIFL Premier Intermediate League. They were replaced by Queen's University, winners of the Premier Intermediate League. The eleventh-placed team from the previous season, PSNI, remained in the Championship this season, after defeating the NIFL Premier Intermediate League runners-up Annagh United 5–3 on aggregate in the relegation play-off.

Stadia and locations

League table

Results

Matches 1–22
During matches 1–22 each team played every other team twice (home and away).

Matches 23–33
During matches 23–33 each team was scheduled to play every other team for the third time (either at home, or away). However, some fixtures did not take place, after the league season was curtailed as a result of the COVID-19 pandemic.

References

External links

NIFL Championship seasons
Northern Ireland
2019–20 in Northern Ireland association football
Northern Ireland